A wooden box is a container made of wood for storage or as a shipping container.  

Construction may include several types of wood; lumber (timber), plywood, engineered woods, etc.  For some purposes, decorative woods are used.

Boxes as shipping containers

Wooden boxes are often used for heavy duty packaging when 
 high strength is needed for heavy and difficult loads
 long term warehousing may be needed
 large size is required
 rigidity is required
 when stacking strength is critical

Boxes and crates are not the same. If the sheathing of the container (plywood, lumber, etc.) can be removed, and a framed structure will remain standing, the container would likely be termed a crate. If removal of the sheathing resulted in there being no way of fastening the lumber around the edges of the container, the container would likely be termed a wooden box.

The strength of a wooden box is rated based on the weight it can carry before the cap (top, ends, and sides) is installed. "Skids" or thick bottom runners, are sometimes specified to allow forklift trucks access for lifting.

Performance is strongly influenced by the specific design, type of wood, type of fasteners (nails, etc.), workmanship, etc.

Some boxes have handles, hand holes, or hand holds.

Nailed wood box

Cleated  box
A cleated box has five or six panel faces with wood strips attached to them.  The panels can be made of plywood, solid or corrugated fiberboard, etc.  Wooden cleats reinforce the panels.

Wirebound box
Very thin lumber is used for a wirebound box.  Wires are stapled or stitched to the girth and to wood cleats.  These are sometimes used for produce and for heavy loose items for military or export use.  These are lighter than wood boxes or crates.  They have excellent tensile strength to contain items but not much stacking strength.

Skid box

A skid box is a wood, corrugated fiberboard, or metal box attached to a heavy duty pallet or platform on a skid (parallel wood runners)

Other wooden boxes

Decorative boxes

Chest

ASTM standards
 
ASTM standards:
 D6179 Standard Test Methods for Rough Handling of Unitized Loads and Large Shipping Cases and Crates 
 D6199 Standard Practice for Quality of Wood Members of Containers and Pallets
 D6251 Standard Specification for Wood-Cleated Panelboard Shipping Boxes 
 D6253 Practice for Treatment and/or marking of Wood Packaging Materials
 D6254 Standard Specification for Wirebound Pallet-Type Wood Boxes 
 D6256 Standard Specification for Wood-Cleated Shipping Boxes and Skidded, Load-Bearing Bases 
 D6573 Standard Specification for General Purpose Wirebound Shipping Boxes 
 D6880-05 Standard Specification for wooden boxes

See also
 Band saw box
 Box compression test
 ISPM 15 Regulations explain requirements for international shipping of wood boxes, crates, or pallets.

Further reading
 McKinlay, A. H., "Transport Packaging", IoPP, 2004 
 Yam, K. L., "Encyclopedia of Packaging Technology", John Wiley & Sons, 2009, 

Containers
Wood
Shipping containers